Ann Trason (born August 30, 1960) is an American ultramarathon runner from Auburn, California.  She set 20 world records during her career and is considered to be the most successful female ultrarunner of all time.

Life

Trason was a top runner in high school, but a knee injury kept her from competing in college and injuries plagued her throughout her running career including not finishing her first two entries to the Western States 100.

Trason's ultra career began when she entered the 1985 American River 50 Miler at age 24 and both won and set a course record. She returned 8 years later and dropped her time by an hour to establish the 6:09 female course record that still stands.. Trason's Western States career began in 1987, but was not able to finish it until 1989 when she was first female finisher. She has won Western States 14 times in all, most recently in 2003. She held the women's division course record for 18 years (17:37:51, set in 1994) until it was broken by Ellie Greenwood in 2012.

Trason appears in Christopher McDougall's accounts of the Leadville Trail 100 in the 1990s in his 2009 book, Born to Run: A Hidden Tribe, Superathletes, and the Greatest Race the World Has Never Seen. Her time of 18:06:24 in the 1994 Leadville is the women's course record.

In both 1996 and 1997 Trason performed the "double" of winning the Western States 100 just 12 days after winning the 56-mile Comrades Marathon in South Africa.

Trason and her ex-husband and training partner Carl Andersen co-directed the Dick Collins Firetrails 50 from 2000 through 2010. Trason set the female course record on the Firetrails 50 the one time she ran it, in 1987.

After a decade away from running, Trason returned to the sport as crew and an occasional racer in 2013. She was a multi-year UltraRunner of the Year, and in 2020, she was inducted into the American Ultrarunning Hall of Fame.

Course records
 6:09:08 – American River 50 mile (1993)
 3:59:32 – Cool Canyon Crawl 50K (1993)
 7:31:24 – Dick Collins Firetrails 50 mile (1987)
 6:13:54 – Hunter Thompson 50 mile
 18:06:24 – Leadville Trail 100 women's record (2nd place overall in 1994)
 8:55:49 – Miwok 100K Trail Race (2001)
 6:43:52 – Quicksilver 50 mile (1992)
 7:29:36 – Silver State 50 mile (1994)

References

External links
 trasonrunning.com

1960 births
Living people
American female ultramarathon runners
Sportspeople from California
People from Kensington, California
21st-century American women